Sir Harold Seddon (6 March 1881 – 25 February 1958) was an Australian politician who served as a member of the Legislative Council of Western Australia from 1922 to 1954. He was President of the Legislative Council from 1946 to 1954.

Early life
Seddon was born in Openshaw, Lancashire, England, to Elizabeth Ann (née Davy) and William Seddon. His nephew, Harold Wilson, served twice as Prime Minister of the United Kingdom. After studying electrical engineering at the Manchester Technical Institute, Seddon worked for a period in the electrical department of the Great Central Railway. He emigrated to Australia in 1901, finding employment on the Eastern Goldfields as an electrical engineer with Western Australian Government Railways. Seddon became prominent in the Amalgamated Engineering Union, and also served on the Southern Cross Municipal Council.

Politics and later life
After the Labor Party split of 1916, Seddon joined the newly formed National Labor Party. He stood as the party's candidate in the seat of Kalgoorlie at the 1917 state election, but was defeated by the sitting member, Labor's Albert Green. From 1920 to 1922, Seddon served on the Kalgoorlie Municipal Council. He was elected to parliament in May 1922, winning election to the Legislative Council's North-East Province as a Nationalist candidate.

In November 1946, following the death of the President of the Legislative Council, James Cornell, Seddon was elected in his place. He was knighted for his service in June 1951. He served as president until the 1954 election, when he was defeated by Labor's John Teahan (in one of a series of Labor victories). Seddon lived in Kalgoorlie in retirement, dying there in February 1958, aged 76. He had married Winifred Jean Dunstan in 1932, with whom he had two sons and two daughters.

See also
 Members of the Western Australian Legislative Council

References

1881 births
1958 deaths
Australian Knights Bachelor
Australian politicians awarded knighthoods
Australian trade unionists
English emigrants to Australia
Liberal Party of Australia members of the Parliament of Western Australia
Members of the Western Australian Legislative Council
National Labor Party politicians
Nationalist Party of Australia members of the Parliament of Western Australia
People from Openshaw
Presidents of the Western Australian Legislative Council
Western Australian local councillors
20th-century Australian politicians
Politicians from Manchester